Tukur Yusuf Buratai    (born 24 November 1960) is a retired Nigerian army lieutenant general, former Chief of Army Staff (appointed by President Muhammadu Buhari in July 2015), and Nigeria's Ambassador to the Republic of Benin. He was commissioned into the Nigerian Army in 1983 and has had multiple command, administrative, and instructional appointments.

Background and education
General Buratai is from Buratai town, Biu Local Government Area of Borno State. His father, Yusuf Buratai, was a non commissioned officer in the Royal West African Frontier Force and World War II veteran who fought in Burma. General Buratai had his primary education at Buratai town and thereafter gained admission to Government Teachers College Potiskum, Yobe State, where he graduated with distinction.

Military career

In January 1981, Buratai attended the Nigerian Defence Academy Kaduna as a member of the 29 Regular Combatant Course (29 RC) where he was given the prestigious appointment of Cadet Sergeant Major (CSM). On successful completion of his Officer Cadet training, he was commissioned as a Second Lieutenant on 17 December 1983 into the Infantry Corps of the Nigerian Army. Buratai has a degree in History from University of Maiduguri and a degree in Philosophy from Bangladesh University of Professionals, Dhaka. He is also a graduate of National Defence College, Mirpur, Bangladesh.

He served in 26 Amphibious Battalion Elele, Port Harcourt, Military Observer at the United Nations Verification Mission II in Angola; later 26 Guards Battalion, Lagos; Lagos Garrison Command Camp. Lt Gen Buratai also served as administrative officer at the State House, Abuja; 82 Motorized Battalion; 81 Battalion, Bakassi Peninsular; Army Headquarters Garrison, Abuja before he became a Directing Staff at the Armed Forces Command and Staff College, Jaji, earning the prestigious "Pass Staff College Dagger" (psc(+)) appellation. 

Subsequently, he served at AHQ Dept of Army Policy and Plans, Abuja; Assistant Chief of Staff Administrative Matters, HQ Infantry Centre Jaji. Additionally, he was again at the Armed Forces Command and Staff College as Director Dept of Land Warfare from where he was appointed Commander 2 Brigade, Port Harcourt, doubling as Commander, Sector 2 JTF Operation PULO SHIELD. Upon promotion to the rank of Major General, he was appointed Commandant, Nigerian Army School of Infantry, Jaji; thereafter he was appointed Director of Procurement DHQ before being appointed Force Commander of the newly reconstituted Multinational Joint Task Force (MJTNF) under the auspices of the Lake Chad Basin Commission and the Benin Republic, an appointment he held till he became Chief of Army Staff.

His operational deployments include Military Observer at the United Nations Verification Mission II in Angola, Op HARMONY IV in the Bakassi Peninsular, OP MESA, Op PULO SHIELD, Op SAFE CONDUCT, MNJTF, Op ZAMAN LAFIYA, and Op LAFIYA DOLE. He was appointed Chief of Army Staff on 13 July 2015.

Buratai was rumoured to have been replaced by President Buhari following the promotion of Maj.-Gen. L.O Adeosun to Lieutenant General, making him of the same rank with Buratai. But the report was immediately debunked by the Army. General Tukur Buratai was eventually removed by President Buhari on January 26, 2021 after widespread calls for the removal of service chiefs due to the worsening security situation in the country during their time of Service.

Dates of promotion
Buratai's promotion dates are

Awards
Lt Gen Buratai's honors and awards include:
Forces Service Star (FSS) 
Meritorious Service Star (MSS)
Distinguished Service Star (DSS) 
Grand Service Star (GSS). 
Pass Staff Course Dagger (psc(+))
Field Command Medal
 Training Support Medal
United Nations Medal for Angolan Verification Medal II
2022 – Commander of the Order of the Federal Republic (CFR)

References 

1960 births
Living people
Chiefs of Army Staff (Nigeria)
Nigerian generals
Nigerian Army officers
Nigerian Defence Academy alumni
Multinational Joint Task Force Commanders
University of Maiduguri alumni
People from Borno State
Instructors at the Nigerian Armed Forces Command and Staff College
Nigerian military officers
Nigerian diplomats
National Defence College (Bangladesh) alumni